The Promise, known in Thai as Puen.. Tee Raluek, is a 2017 Thai horror film directed by Sophon Sakdaphisit and produced by GDH 559/Jor Kwang Films. It stars Namthip Jongrachatawiboon and Apichaya Thongkham, and was shot in Bangkok's famously unfinished Sathorn Unique Tower.

The film's plot revolves around two teenage friends, Ib and Boum, who decide to commit suicide together at the building as their families face financial ruin during the 1997 Asian financial crisis. However, Boum becomes scared and reneges on the promise. Twenty years later, when she re-visits the building with her daughter, Bell, the result of Boum's past actions returns to haunt them.

The Promise earned a moderate 33.7 million baht (US$1 million) at the Thai box office, and was the fourth-grossing local film of 2017. The film received mixed reviews; it has been described as formulaic-yet-effective, and criticized for not realizing the potential of the financial-crisis background. The film won the 27th Suphannahong National Film Award for Best Visual Effects.

Cast
 Namthip Jongrachatawiboon as Boum
 Apichaya Thongkham as Bell
 Thunyaphat Pattarateerachaicharoen as Young Boum
 Panisara Rikulsurakan as Ib
 Deuntem Salitul as Ib's mother
 Benjamin Joseph Varney as Aof
 Suchada Poonpattanasuk as Boum's mother
 Surachai Ningsanond as Boum's father
 Teerapop Songwaja as Mon
 Duangjai Hiransri as Mon's mother
 Sawanee Utoomma as Auntie Chu
 Chaleeda Gilbert as Taew
 Boonchai Jailim as the Neurologist
 Sivapee Mapaisalkij as the Surgeon
 Krieng Wongnongtaey as the Credit officer

References

External links
 
 

GDH 559 films
2017 films
Thai-language films
2017 horror films
Thai horror films
Thai supernatural horror films